National Cashew Day is celebrated annually November 23. This day is to celebrate a popular nut for partying and snacking. Cashews also provide excellent sources of antioxidants and minerals. National Cashew Day is only celebrated nationwide in the United States of America. This unofficial holiday was first observed in 2015.

History
There is yet to be a creator or origin found for this holiday.

Observe
National Cashew Day can be celebrated by eating cashews or using them in a favorite recipe. It can also be celebrated by adding #NationalCashewDay on one's social media pages.

See also

 List of food days

References

Further reading
 

Awareness days
Observances about food and drink
Cashews